At least three warships of Japan have borne the name Katori:

 , a training vessel of the Japan Maritime Self-Defense Force launched in 1968 and decommissioned in 1998

References

Japanese Navy ship names
Imperial Japanese Navy ship names